Billboard magazine each year releases a Top Hot 100 songs of the year, counted from the first week of November to the final week in October. For 2009, the chart was published on December 11.  The 2009 list was dominated by The Black Eyed Peas and Lady Gaga, who shared the top four spots. In late December, DJ Earworm released a mashup video to YouTube titled "Blame It On The Pop", featuring the top twenty-five songs from the list, as he had also done the previous two years for his "United State of Pop" series. The video quickly received four million views in little over a week.

See also
2009 in music
List of Billboard Hot 100 number-one singles of 2009
List of Billboard Hot 100 top-ten singles in 2009

References

External links
Mashup of the top 25 songs by DJ Earworm.

United States Year-end
Billboard charts